Havant New was a temporary terminus between Havant and  on the Portsmouth Direct Line: a temporary platform, erected by the L&SWR who were granted permission to run all trains along the line by its independent venture owners, but which did not reach Portsmouth, which started a dispute with the LB&SCR which owned the only railway south of Havant.

Battle of Havant

In 1858, the two local railway companies started the "Battle of Havant". The London, Brighton and South Coast Railway ran the London to Portsmouth Line via Hove, and refused to allow the London and South Western Railway to use any of that track to reach Portsmouth. The LB&SCR blocked the line just north of the intended junction, prompting the L&SWR to open a temporary station at Havant. The station was opened on 1 January 1859. The passengers could then carry on into Portsmouth by train. After two years the companies came to an agreement and the L&SWR were allowed access to the disputed line. The station closed on 24 January 1859.

The site today

Nothing remains of the station today; the site is marked only by some old semaphore signal posts, some slates and a platelayers' hut. The station was the only one on the line built of blue bricks. The surrounds were not developed at the time of the station's existence so having fulfilled its political function it closed, in 1859.

See also 
 Frog wars

References

Notes

Sources

 
 Southern E-Group's page including details of the battle
 

Disused railway stations in Hampshire
Former London and South Western Railway stations
Railway stations in Great Britain opened in 1859
Railway stations in Great Britain closed in 1859